The following highways are numbered 987:

United States